Svarychiv is a village in Kalush Raion in Ivano-Frankivsk Oblast (province) of western Ukraine. It belongs to Rozhniativ settlement hromada, one of the hromadas of Ukraine. 

The population on the all-Ukrainian population census 2001 was 5,039 people. It occupies an area of 28,189 km2. Postal code – 77605. Telephone code – 0-3474.

History
The first mention of Svarychiv dates from the year 1648.

Until 18 July 2020, Svarychiv belonged to Rozhniativ Raion. It was the biggest settlement in the raion. The raion was abolished in July 2020 as part of the administrative reform of Ukraine, which reduced the number of raions of Ivano-Frankivsk Oblast to six. The area of Rozhniativ Raion was merged into Kalush Raion.

Local Council 
77665, Ivano-Frankivsk Region, Rozhniativ Area, Svarychiv, Dovha Street, 134.

People, associated with Svarychiv 

The village inhabitants are proud of the following people who grew up in Svarychiv and made it famous:
 Vasyl Mykolaiovych Voloshchuk – violinist, artist vocal genre, the honoured artist of Ukraine, laureate of many contests and festivals.
 Halyna Petrivna Pavliv – honored master of folk art of Ukraine.
 Mariia Rybchak – the honored worker of culture of Ukraine.
 Andrii Shevchuk – laureate of the prize of "the Pride of the country".
 Andrii Matsevko – the Ukrainian singer, participant of talent shows Ukraine's got talent and X-factor.
 Orysia Vasylivna Marchuk – the public prosecutor.
 Bohdan Vasyliovych Burak – the Public Prosecutor of Kalush City.
 Mykhailo Petrovych Turchyn – the Director of Rozhniativ Children's Art School.
 Vasyl Mykhailovych Senychak – the honored power engineer of Ukrhydroenergo.

Notes

References 
 Svarichew on the website of the Verkhovna Rada of Ukraine
 weather.in.ua

Villages in Kalush Raion